Night Network is Melbourne's weekend overnight public transport system, which commenced operation on 1 January 2016 for a 12-month trial, which was later extended by six-months, and made permanent in April 2017. It comprises all of Melbourne's regular electric railway lines, six tram lines, 21 night bus services, and four regional coach services. The night bus services replaced the previous NightRider services, with 10 operating radial from the CBD and the remaining 11 operating from suburban railway stations.

History
In January 2014, in the lead up to the 2014 Victorian State election, the Australian Labor Party promised to commence a trial of all night public transport on weekends, dubbed Homesafe, if elected. Following the Australian Labor Party's victory, cost overruns were announced in August 2015, with the plan to cost $83.6 million, not the $50 million estimated during the election, due to increased security costs. The network was unveiled on 30 October 2015, along with its new name, Night Network, with the Minister for Public Transport Jacinta Allan claiming 70% of Melbourne's dwellings would be covered by Night Network.

Night Network commenced operation on 1 January 2016 on a 12-month trial basis. In its first weekend of operation 9,862 myki touch ons were recorded, representing a three-fold increase in patronage compared to the former NightRider bus system. However, this may understate patronage as it fails to account for fare evaders, those travelling in the free tram zone, and those with periodical tickets who may not have touched on. The trial was later extended until June 2017, and made permanent in April 2017.

Night Network services

Night Train
All of Melbourne's train services operated by Metro Trains Melbourne, except the Flemington Racecourse and Stony Point lines, operate as part of Night Network, servicing all metropolitan stations except for City Loop stations and Southern Cross, which close at midnight and 1am respectively. Trains operate hourly on all lines, with some lines operating as shuttles from major interchange stations.

Night Tram
Routes 19, 67, 75, 86, 96 and 109 operates overnight to half-hour frequencies. The Free Tram Zone remains in operation during Night Network operating times.

Night Bus
Twenty-one night bus services, operated by CDC Melbourne, Dysons, Kinetic Melbourne, Transit Systems Victoria and Ventura Bus Lines, run to a 24-hour weekend service on Fridays and Saturdays, as part of Night Network. Thirteen routes operate on Fridays and Saturdays. Night Bus replaced NightRider bus services, which largely follow railway lines, with PTV claiming most passengers will still have access to all night public transport.

Night Coach
V/Line operate Night Coach services to Ballarat, Bendigo, Traralgon, and Geelong, departing Southern Cross station at approximately 2am. The coaches operate in lieu of regional trains, servicing railway stations along said routes. In October 2016, Seymour was added to the network.

Ticketing
Myki tickets are valid for Night Network services, with standard fares applying, while V/Line tickets are charged at off-peak rates. Authorised Officers patrol Night Network, checking for fare evasion.

References

External links
Night Network – Public Transport Victoria

Bus transport in Melbourne
Night bus service
Public transport in Melbourne
Rail transport in Victoria (Australia)
Trams in Melbourne
2016 establishments in Australia